Established in 2003 and dissolved in 2012, Chicago’s Baby Teeth came roaring back in 2022.   Their second life brings joy to followers of lean pop/rock, thick vocal harmonies, generous hooks, and witty lyrics.  The keyboard/bass/drum trio has drawn comparisons to Todd Rundgren, Hall & Oates, Elvis Costello, Queen, Joe Jackson, and Electric Light Orchestra.  They’ve shared stages with indie luminaries like Fiery Furnaces and Silver Jews, made multiple appearances at Austin’s South By Southwest festival, and earned glowing reviews in Pitchfork, AllMusic, and the Chicago Reader.

Playfully self-aware, Baby Teeth’s energetic live show features ample three-part harmonies and memorable arrangements.  Bassist Jim Cooper (Detholz!, Daniel Knox, Bobby Conn) and Peter Andreadis (All City Affairs) are both songwriters/bandleaders themselves, forming a pulsing, innovative rhythm section.

When he was 11, Baby Teeth singer/songwriter/keyboardist Abraham Levitan (Bobby Conn & the Glass Gypsies, Shame That Tune) began writing songs about middle age.  Perhaps it was a little premature?  Three decades later, he’s celebrating and skewering marriage, fatherhood, middle-class ambition, and the paranoid remains of the American dream.  What’s left to do when reality crashes the party of your stadium-sized dreams?  “Carry On Regardless”... to quote the title of Baby Teeth’s forthcoming LP, coming fall 2022 and produced by Bobby Conn.

Members
Abraham Levitan – lead vocals, keyboards
Jim Cooper – bass guitar, vocals
Peter Andreadis – drums, vocals

Discography

Albums
The Baby Teeth Album (2005)
The Simp (2007)
Hustle Beach (2009)
White Tonight (2012)

Singles
The Baby Teeth Single (2003)
Hustle Beach Single (2009)
Dripping Candle (2019)
Don't Go Outside (2022)

EPs
For The Heathers (2006)
Boss (2011)

Other
52 Teeth (2007–08) – Collection of new songs released once a week for a year

References

External links
Official Website
Bandcamp
Facebook
Instagram
YouTube
Spotify
Apple Music
52 Teeth
[ Allmusic Profile]

Indie rock musical groups from Illinois
Musical groups from Chicago